Frederick Hughes  (1860–?) was a Welsh international footballer. He was part of the Wales national football team between 1882 and 1884, playing 6 matches. He played his first match on 25  February 1882 against Ireland and his last match on 29  March 1884 against Scotland.

 - Welsh International, first joined Vics in 1876 and was a dashing two-footed gent who never fouled anyone. A true sportsman. Tragically, his life ended in 1923 when his body was found floating in the river Dane after he had been missing for weeks

See also
 List of Wales international footballers (alphabetical)
 List of Wales international footballers born outside Wales

References

https://archive.ph/2001.03.09-054457/http://www.vicsfan.uklinux.net/famousplayers.htm

1860 births
Welsh footballers
Wales international footballers
Place of birth missing
Date of death missing
Association footballers not categorized by position